Leonid Petrovich Tatarinov (November 12, 1926 — August 24, 2011) was a Russian and Soviet  paleontologist and evolutionary biologist. He was an Academician of the USSR Academy of Sciences (1981) and Russian Academy of Sciences (1991), director of the Paleontological Institute (1975 - 1992) and  editor-in-chief of Paleontological journal (1976 - 2001). His research interests were in the comparative anatomy of vertebrates, tetrapod phylogeny, and evolution.

Tatarinov became interested in science from his school years but he was conscripted into the army at the age of 17 in 1943 but discharged in 1944 after suffering from an infection. He then went to the Moscow State University and was influenced by A.F. Kohts,  I.I. Schmalhausen, and Raissa L’vovna Berg. He studied population genetics under Berg and then took a keener interest in organismal evolution after being influenced by G.P.  Dementiev.  He studied amphibians under A.N. Druzhinin and B.S. Matveev. He then studied birds with E.P. Spangenberg. As a student he was a witness to the historic clash between Lysenko and the geneticists in 1948 which was to affect Soviet biology. In 1953 he received a PhD with a thesis  “On the Role of Living Conditions in the Phylogeny of Amphibians.” In 1969 he received a D.Sc. for a thesis on “Problems of the Evolution of Theriodonts.” He became the director of the paleontological institute from 1975. Tatarinov believed in deep parallelisms in vertebrate evolution and did not accept the ideas of phylogeny reconstruction that make use of parsimonious character changes.

References

Russian biologists
Russian paleontologists
1926 births
2011 deaths
Burials in Troyekurovskoye Cemetery
Moscow State University alumni
Soviet paleontologists
Soviet biologists
Paleontological Journal editors